Budyonnovsky District is an administrative and municipal district (raion), one of the twenty-six in Stavropol Krai, Russia. It is located in the eastern central part of the krai. Its administrative center is the town of Budyonnovsk (which is not administratively a part of the district). Population:  54,085 (2002 Census); 47,441 (1989 Census).

Administrative and municipal status
Within the framework of administrative divisions, Budyonnovsky District is one of the twenty-six in the krai. The town of Budyonnovsk serves as its administrative center, despite being incorporated separately as a town of krai significance—an administrative unit with the status equal to that of the districts.

As a municipal division, the district is incorporated as Budyonnovsky Municipal District, with the town of krai significance of Budyonnovsk being incorporated within it as Budyonnovsk Urban Settlement.

References

Notes

Sources

Districts of Stavropol Krai
